Wolfgang Glock may refer to:

Wolfgang Glock (rower) (born 1944), German Olympic rower
Wolfgang Glock (footballer) (born 1946), German football player